András Pintér (born 1 April 1994) is a Hungarian football player who currently plays for MTK Hungaria FC.

Club statistics

Updated to games played as of 7 February 2022.

External links
Profile at HLSZ 
Profile at MLSZ 

1994 births
Living people
People from Kecskemét
Hungarian footballers
Hungary youth international footballers
Association football midfielders
MTK Budapest FC players
Soproni VSE players
Kaposvári Rákóczi FC players
Tiszakécske FC footballers
Nemzeti Bajnokság I players
Sportspeople from Bács-Kiskun County